Trogoxylon punctatum is a species of powder-post beetle in the family Bostrichidae. It is found in Central America and North America.

References

Further reading

External links

 

Bostrichidae
Articles created by Qbugbot
Beetles described in 1866